Lugaggia was a municipality in the district of Lugano in the canton of Ticino in Switzerland.

References

Former municipalities of Ticino